The Agua del Toro Dam is an arch dam on the Diamante River about  west of San Rafael in Mendoza Province, Argentina. The primary purpose of the dam is hydroelectric power generation and it supports a  power station located downstream. Construction on the dam began in 1966, and it was completed in 1973. The power station was started the same year and commissioned in 1982. The dam and power station is part of the Rio Diamante System which is owned jointly by Hidroeléctrica Diamante (HIDISA) and Hidroeléctrica de los Nihuiles (HINISA).

References 

Dams in Argentina
Arch dams
Dams completed in 1973
Buildings and structures in Mendoza Province
Energy infrastructure completed in 1982
1982 establishments in Argentina